Philosopher's stone is a term for the legendary goal of Western alchemists. 

Philosopher's Stone also may refer to:

Art, entertainment, and media

Comics

 Philosopher's Stone (Fullmetal Alchemist), a plot element in the manga series Fullmetal Alchemist
 "The Philosopher's Stone" (Fullmetal Alchemist episode)
"The Fabulous Philosopher's Stone" (1954), a Donald Duck story

Fictional entities
 Philosopher's Stone, a magical object in the Harry Potter universe

Films
Harry Potter and the Philosopher's Stone (film), the 2001 film directed by Chris Columbus, based on the novel of the same name
Parash Pathar (1958) or The Philosopher's Stone, a Bengali film by Satyajit Ray

Games
 The Quest of the Philosopher's Stone (1986), a fantasy board game published by Questone Marketing, Inc.
 Harry Potter and the Philosopher's Stone (video game), 2001 video game based on the film of the same name.

Literature
 Den vises sten, a fourteenth-century Swedish poem on the Philosopher's Stone.
 The Philosophers' Stone, a chapter title in Alchemia (1606) by Andreas Libavius
The Philosopher's Stone (novel) (1969), a science fiction novel by Colin Wilson
Harry Potter and the Philosopher's Stone (1997), the first novel in the Harry Potter series by J. K. Rowling
Indiana Jones and the Philosopher's Stone (1995), a novel by Max McCoy
The Philosopher's Stone: A Quest for the Secrets of Alchemy,  a book by Peter Marshall (author)

Music
 Der Stein der Weisen, opera by Wolfgang Amadeus Mozart and others
 The Philosopher's Stone (album), a 1998 album by Van Morrison
 "Philosopher's Stone", a Van Morrison song from Back on Top (1999)
Harry Potter and the Philosopher's Stone (soundtrack), the soundtrack to the 2001 film, composed by John Williams

Other uses
 Philosopher's stones, sclerotia of psilocybin mushrooms, including Psilocybe tampanensis and Psilocybe mexicana